The HP Photosmart M407 is a 4.1-megapixel entry-level digital camera which was launched on August 28, 2004. It uses SD Memory Card storage. It was designed as an easy-to-use device for beginners and sold at a relatively low price.

References

M407